Christian John Zahra  (born 8 April 1973) was an Australian Labor Party member of the Australian House of Representatives from October 1998 to October 2004, representing the regional seat of McMillan, Victoria.

At the 2001 Federal Election, he was one of the few Australian Labor Party members to increase his share of the vote, gaining a 2PP swing to him of 1.9 per cent, after entering the election with a margin of less than 500 votes. After the election, he was appointed Parliamentary Secretary to the Shadow Minister for Communications. At that time, he was the youngest Federal MP ever to reach the status of parliamentary secretary. He also went on to serve as Parliamentary Secretary to the Shadow Minister for Infrastructure, Transport and Regional Development.

In the 2004 election, following a redistribution that turned the electorate of McMillan from a marginal Labor to a marginal Liberal seat with a margin of 2.8 per cent, Zahra was defeated by Russell Broadbent.

Zahra was born in Malta and migrated to Australia with his family when he was three years of age. He grew up and was educated in Traralgon, Victoria. He holds a Bachelor of Economics from La Trobe University and a Master of Assessment and Evaluation from the University of Melbourne. Before entering the Parliament, he was Chief Executive Officer of the Aboriginal Health Service in Morwell, Victoria.

Since 2004, Zahra has served as a Director of the Victorian Energy Networks Corporation, Chair of the Victorian Government's Sustainable Timber Industry Council and Chairman of the Australian Government's $1 billion Regional Development Australia Fund Advisory Panel. He has also served as a Director of two Aboriginal organisations in the Kimberley, Waardi Limitedand Nyimarr Limited. He is a Founding Director of the Regional Australia Institute.

From January 2015 to January 2017, Zahra was Chief Executive Officer of  Wunan Foundation, a leading Aboriginal development organisation based in the East Kimberley. Before taking on this role he was a Director in the Strategy Group at KPMG Australia. Between 2017 and 2018, he was Executive Director of the National Catholic Education Commission.

Zahra is currently Principal at Impact Partners Australia, a consulting firm. In 2018 he rejoined the Board of  Waardi Limited, a traditional owner economic development organisation based in Broome, Western Australia, as an Independent Non-Executive Director.

Zahra has been a Fellow of the Australian Institute of Company Directors since 2011.

In June 2018, Zahra was made a Member of the Order of Australia (AM) for "significant service to rural and regional development, to the advancement of Indigenous welfare, and to the Australian Parliament".

In July 2019, Zahra was appointed by the Victorian Government as a Member of the Panel of Administrators at South Gippsland Shire Council. The Council was dismissed by the Victorian Government following the recommendation of the Commission of Inquiry into the Council. The Panel is acting as the South Gippsland Shire Council from 24 July 2019 until the next election for the Council in 2021.

References

1973 births
Living people
Australian Labor Party members of the Parliament of Australia
Labor Right politicians
Members of the Australian House of Representatives
Members of the Australian House of Representatives for McMillan
Members of the Order of Australia
Maltese emigrants to Australia
21st-century Australian politicians
20th-century Australian politicians
Fellows of the Australian Institute of Company Directors